The state anthem of the Tajik SSR was the regional anthem of the Tajik Soviet Socialist Republic, a constituent republic of the Soviet Union, adopted in 1946. After the dissolution of the Soviet Union in 1991, this anthem was still in use until 1994 when Tajikistan adopted a new anthem with different lyrics but retained the same melody.

Background
The anthem was used between 1946 and 1994. The music was composed by Suleiman Yudakov, and the lyrics were written by Abolqasem Lahouti. The melody is preserved in "Surudi Milli", the current national anthem of Tajikistan, with different lyrics. In 1977, the lyrics were changed to remove mentions of Joseph Stalin. This is the version presented here for the Tajik stanzas, but the Russian version given here is the old one.

Unlike other former Soviet states like Belarus, Kazakhstan and Uzbekistan that appropriated their old Soviet-era regional anthems as national ones but did so without the Soviet lyrics, Tajikistan retained the Soviet lyrics for a time before replacing them in 1994.

It is also one of the nine countries to continuously use their Soviet-era anthems; the other eight being Uzbekistan, Russia (since 2000), Kazakhstan (until 2006), Turkmenistan (until 1996), Belarus, Kyrgyzstan (until 1992), Azerbaijan (until 1992), Ukraine (until 1992).

Lyrics

1977–1991 Version

1946–1977 Version

Notes

References

External links
 Instrumental recording in MP3 format (Full version)
 Instrumental recording in MP3 format (Short version)
 MIDI file
 Vocal recording in MP3 format
 Lyrics - nationalanthems.info
 (1946-1953 version)

Tajik SSR
National symbols of Tajikistan
Tajikistani music
Tajik Soviet Socialist Republic
National anthem compositions in A minor